Scatella is a genus of shore flies in the family Ephydridae. There are at least 140 described species in Scatella.

See also
 List of Scatella species

References

Further reading

External links

 

Ephydridae
Taxa named by Jean-Baptiste Robineau-Desvoidy
Ephydroidea genera